Middlewood may refer to:
Middlewood, South Yorkshire, a suburb of Sheffield, South Yorkshire, England
Middlewood Hospital, a former Psychiatric hospital in Middlewood, Sheffield.
Middlewood, Cheshire, a settlement next to Higher Poynton in Cheshire, England.
Middlewood railway station, a railway station on the Stockport to Buxton line in England
Middlewood Way, a linear park between Macclesfield and Marple in England
Middlewood, Cornwall, a village in Cornwall, England
Middlewood, Herefordshire, a village in Herefordshire, England
Middlewood, Nova Scotia, Canada
Middlewood Green, a village in Surrey, England
Middlewood Scout Camp, a campsite for Scouts and Guides in Worsley, Greater Manchester.